1,4-Dioxin (also referred as dioxin or p-dioxin) is a heterocyclic, organic, non-aromatic compound with the chemical formula CHO. There is an isomeric form of 1,4-dioxin, 1,2-dioxin (or o-dioxin). 1,2-Dioxin is very unstable due to its peroxide-like characteristics.

The term "dioxin" is most commonly used for a family of derivatives of dioxin, known as polychlorinated dibenzodioxins (PCDDs).

Preparation
1,4-Dioxin can be prepared by cycloaddition, namely by the Diels–Alder reaction of furan and maleic anhydride. The adduct formed has a carbon-carbon double bond, which is converted to an epoxide. The epoxide then undergoes a retro-Diels–Alder reaction, forming 1,4-dioxin and regenerating maleic anhydride.

Derivatives

The word "dioxin" can refer in a general way to compounds which have a dioxin core skeletal structure with substituent molecular groups attached to it. For example, dibenzo-1,4-dioxin is a compound whose structure consists of two benzo- groups fused onto a 1,4-dioxin ring.

Polychlorinated dibenzodioxins

Because of their extreme importance as environmental pollutants, current scientific literature uses the name dioxins commonly for simplification to denote the chlorinated derivatives of dibenzo-1,4-dioxin, more precisely the polychlorinated dibenzodioxins (PCDDs), among which 2,3,7,8-tetrachlorodibenzodioxin (TCDD), a  derivative, is the best known. The polychlorinated dibenzodioxins, which can also be classified in the family of halogenated organic compounds, have been shown to bioaccumulate in humans and wildlife due to their lipophilic properties, and are known teratogens, mutagens, and carcinogens.

PCDDs are formed through combustion, chlorine bleaching and manufacturing processes. The combination of heat and chlorine creates dioxin. Since chlorine is often a part of the Earth's environment, natural ecological activity such as volcanic activity and forest fires can lead to the formation of PCDDs. Nevertheless, PCDDs are mostly produced by human activity.

Famous PCDD exposure cases include Agent Orange sprayed over vegetation by the British military in Malaya during the Malayan Emergency and the U.S. military in Vietnam during the Vietnam War, the Seveso disaster, and the poisoning of Viktor Yushchenko.

Polychlorinated dibenzofurans are a related class compounds to PCDDs which are often included within the general term "dioxins".

References

Dioxins